Progress M-9 was a Soviet uncrewed cargo spacecraft which was launched in 1991 to resupply the Mir space station. The twenty-seventh of sixty four Progress spacecraft to visit Mir, it used the Progress-M 11F615A55 configuration, and had the serial number 210. It carried supplies including food, water and oxygen for the EO-9 crew aboard Mir, as well as equipment for conducting scientific research, and fuel for adjusting the station's orbit and performing manoeuvres. It was the third Progress spacecraft to carry a VBK-Raduga capsule, which was used to return equipment and experiment results to Earth.

Progress M-9 was launched at 22:54:10 GMT on 20 August 1991, atop a Soyuz-U2 carrier rocket flying from Site 1/5 at the Baikonur Cosmodrome. Following two days of free flight, it docked with the forward port of Mir's core module at 00:54:17 GMT on 23 August.

Progress M-9 undocked from Mir at 01:53:00 GMT on 30 September, and was deorbited few hours later at 07:45, to a destructive reentry over the Pacific Ocean. The Raduga capsule landed in the Kazakh Soviet Socialist Republic at 08:16:24 GMT.

See also

1991 in spaceflight
List of Progress flights
List of uncrewed spaceflights to Mir

References

Spacecraft launched in 1991
1991 in the Soviet Union
Progress (spacecraft) missions